Karsan ( English: Karsan Automotive Industry and Trade Joint-Stock Company) is a Turkish commercial vehicles manufacturer, based in Akçalar, Nilüfer, Bursa Province. "Karsan" is an acronym for "Karoseri Sanayii" (English: Carrosserie/Bodyworks Industry)

History
Karsan was founded in 1966 in Bursa, Turkey, to produce light commercial vehicles. Koç Group assumed management control of the company between 1979-1998. Later on Kıraça Group took over the company in 1998 by acquiring the majority of the shares under the leadership of İnan Kıraç.

Karsan, owned by 100% Turkish capital, produces and sells Peugeot light commercial vehicles under a licensing agreement with the French manufacturer, as well as the Fiat Ducato and its rebadged version the Peugeot Boxer. In addition to these, Karsan produces and sells special vehicles such as ambulances, taxis, patrol vehicles and 4x4s.

Karsan also has cooperations with Hyundai for light trucks manufacture, with Renault Trucks for long-distance trailer-trucks and with BredaMenarinibus for bus manufacture.

Karsan's V-1 was one of three finalists, alongside the Ford Transit Connect and Nissan NV200, for New York City's Taxi of Tomorrow. The Nissan NV200 was announced the winning model on May 3, 2011.

At the end of 2010, the J9 Premier minibus was replaced with the Karsan J10, available in three body versions-with 14, 17 or 20 seats, and powered by a Euro 4 common rail 2,3 liter diesel engine of Iveco origin.
At the end of 2013, the J10 minibus has been replaced by the Karsan Jest.

In December 2018 the company acquired the 70% of Industria Italiana Autobus through a capital increase. The following month, after a meeting with Ministry of Economic Development, the participation in IIA fell to 20%.

Current models

Peugeot Partner (1997–present)
Peugeot Boxer (2001–unknown)
Fiat Ducato (2001–present)
Hyundai Truck (2007–present)
Citroën Berlingo (2008–present)
BredaMenarinibus Vivacity (2010–present)
BredaMenarinibus Avancity (2010–present)
Karsan V-1 (prototype)
Karsan Jest (2013–present)
Karsan Atak (2014–present)
Karsan Star (2014–present)
Hyundai H350 (2015–present)
Renault Megane IV Sedan (2022-to commence)
Karsan E-ata (20xx-present)

Former models

Peugeot J9 (1981–2006)
Karsan J9 Premier (2006–2010)
Renault Premium (2008–2013)
Renault Kerax (2009–2013)
Karsan J10 (2010–2015)

Karsan Worldwide

See also
List of automobile manufacturers 
Automotive industry in Turkey
List of companies of Turkey
Taxicabs of New York City

References

External links
Karsan website
Karsan Taxi NYC
Karsan Atak
Karsan J9 Premier based on Peugeot J9

Vehicle manufacturing companies established in 1966
Companies listed on the Istanbul Stock Exchange
Bus manufacturers of Turkey
Companies based in Bursa
Turkish brands
Truck manufacturers of Turkey
Turkish companies established in 1966